Senator Proudfit may refer to:

Andrew Proudfit (1820–1883), Wisconsin State Senate
James Kerr Proudfit (1831–1917), Wisconsin State Senate